Natalie Diane Grant (born December 21, 1971) is an American singer and songwriter of contemporary Christian music. She received the Gospel Music Association's Dove Award for Female Vocalist of the Year four consecutive years (2006, 2007, 2008 and 2009), and again in 2012. She has also been nominated for eight Grammy Awards (2012, 2014, 2015, 2017, 2018 and 2020).

Early life 

Grant was born December 21, 1971 in Seattle, Washington. She enrolled at Northwest College (Now Northwest University) in Kirkland, Washington, studying to be a schoolteacher. She reportedly figured that her musical gifts were merely for sharing with her local church until she learned how to find God's true calling for her life, and so switched directions and began a career in Christian music.

Career 

Grant first started in contemporary Christian music when she auditioned for the travelling music group Truth. Later she moved to Nashville, Tennessee to pursue her solo career.  There she signed with Benson Records in 1997 and began working on her self-titled debut which was released in 1999. She left Benson for Pamplin Music soon after and released the album Stronger in 2001. She then ended up at Curb Records after Pamplin folded, where she has made five solo albums as of 2012, starting with Deeper Life in 2003. Awaken was her breakthrough success, in 2005. It was RIAA certified gold. It was followed by Love Revolution on August 24, 2010 and Hurricane on October 15, 2013.

Grant released three albums between 1999 and 2003, although the majority of her hits came later in her career. She has since reported being unhappy with the way she was imaged by her early record label which marketed her partly on her looks and says of her first record, "It wasn't me at all either." However, she credits her early albums with having been necessary to her progressing and growing into an artist that takes control of such decisions, starting with her first widely successful album, Awaken.

Another factor that was essential to her later success was a life-altering trip to India in 2004. Not only did this trip inspire her charitable pursuits, "but it brought a new passion and direction to her music." Instead of focusing only on what song might be a hit, Grant reports that she now focuses on songs that will inspire, give hope, and motivate others to make their lives matter.

There have been other noteworthy events along the way. She wrote a book entitled The Real Me in 2005.  She toured on the Speaking Louder Than Before tour with Bebo Norman and Jeremy Camp in 2008. She contributed the song "Breathe On Me" to Crystal Aikin's self-titled debut album. She was a speaker and performer on the Revolve Tour, a conference for teen girls from Women of Faith. She toured with award-winning, multi-platinum selling Billboard magazine's Artist of The Decade MercyMe in April 2011. Also, in October 2011 she starred in the Gospel Music Channel (GMC) made-for-television movie Decision.

On September 27, 2013, it was announced that Grant would be hosting the GSN original game show It Takes a Church, which premiered on June 5, 2014.

She released her tenth studio album No Stranger on September 25, 2020. It was preceded by the lead single "My Weapon" which was released on February 21, 2020.

Personal life 

In pursuing her music career, Grant moved to Nashville, Tennessee, where she now lives with her Canadian producer husband, Bernie Herms, and their three daughters; Grace and Isabella (born 2007) and Sadie (born 2010)

In an interview with The 700 Club, Natalie revealed that she suffered from bulimia. She says God helped her get over her eating disorder. She later wrote a book in 2005 titled The Real Me: Being the Girl God Sees, about her struggle and how she overcame it.

Philanthropy 

Grant is involved in campaigning against human trafficking. She was affected by an episode of Law & Order that dealt with the topic and began to do research. Her studies led her and her husband to travel to India to witness the red-light districts and what is being done to stop them. That experience changed the trajectory of Natalie's life and reportedly changed the way she approaches her music.

In 2005 Grant founded The Home Foundation, which has since evolved into Abolition International, an international organization to eradicate sex trafficking through aftercare accreditation, advocacy, and education and provision of restoration homes for victims of sex trafficking.

On October 23, 2012, Grant received the 2012 Bishop Ketteler Award for Social Justice from the Sisters of Divine Providence, who honoured her for her work against human trafficking.

Discography 

 1999: Natalie Grant
 2001: Stronger
 2003: Deeper Life
 2004: Worship with Natalie Grant and Friends
 2005: Awaken
 2005: Believe
 2008: Relentless
 2010: Love Revolution
 2013: Hurricane
 2015: Be One
 2020: No Stranger

Bibliography 

 2005: The Real Me: Being the Girl God Sees 
 2014: Dare to Be Devoted: 30 Day Devotional 
 2016: A Dolphin Wish (Faithgirlz / Glimmer Girls) 
 2016: London Art Chase (Faithgirlz / Glimmer Girls) 
 2016: Miracle in Music City (Faithgirlz / Glimmer Girls) 
 2016: Finding Your Voice: What Every Woman Needs to Live Her God-Given Passions Out Loud

Filmography

Awards and nominations

GMA Dove Awards

Grammy Awards

References

External links 

 
 Grant's videos on YouTube
 Grant's videos on GodTube

1971 births
Living people
20th-century American singers
20th-century Christians
20th-century American women singers
21st-century American singers
21st-century Christians
21st-century American women singers
American game show hosts
American performers of Christian music
Christian music songwriters
Christians from Washington (state)
Curb Records artists
Musicians from Seattle
Performers of contemporary Christian music